Niclas Wallin (born 20 February 1975) is a Swedish former professional ice hockey player who played in the National Hockey League (NHL). He won the Stanley Cup with the Carolina Hurricanes in 2006.

Playing career
Wallin's career began in Bodens IK, his hometown team. Having had a breakthrough in the 1995–96 season, he was picked up by the Swedish Elitserien team Brynäs. After spending some years with Brynäs, Wallin was drafted in the fourth round, 97th overall by the Hurricanes at the 2000 NHL Entry Draft and remained at the team until February 2010. During the 2004–05 NHL lockout, Wallin returned to his native Sweden, playing 39 games for Luleå. In 2006, he won his first Stanley Cup with the Carolina Hurricanes.

Niclas Wallin is known to many Hurricanes fans as The Secret Weapon due to his timing with postseason goals. He has only scored four of them, but all of them have been game winners, and three have come in overtime, including a game against the Montreal Canadiens in 2002 and Game 2 of the 2006 postseason series against the New Jersey Devils. The fourth one was a game-winning goal in Game 2 of the 2011 Western Conference Semi-Finals against the Detroit Red Wings.

Wallin was featured in a Top 10 list on TSN's Sportscentre in 2006 after he scored a famous own goal in a game against the Washington Capitals. A delayed penalty was called on Washington, and Carolina removed their goalie from the net to get an extra skater. Wallin was chased out of the offensive zone by Alexander Ovechkin and tried to deke around a passing referee. When he did this, Wallin lost control of the puck and it sailed more than 100 feet into Carolina's open net.

On 7 February 2010, it was announced that Wallin was traded to the San Jose Sharks along with a fifth-round draft pick in exchange for a second-round draft pick that originally belonged to the Buffalo Sabres in the 2010 NHL Entry Draft.

On 26 June 2010, Wallin re-signed to a one-year contract to remain with the Sharks for the following 2010–11 season.

On 15 June 2011, Wallin signed a three-year contract to return home to captain Luleå HF of the Elitserien. After one season with the club, Wallin ended his professional career due to injury.

International play
After a lengthy hockey career, Wallin finally got the call to represent Sweden in the 2008 World Championships, in which he did not disappoint, scoring two goals and two assists in seven games.

Career statistics

Regular season and playoffs

International

References

External links
 

1975 births
Carolina Hurricanes draft picks
Carolina Hurricanes players
Cincinnati Cyclones (IHL) players
Living people
Luleå HF players
People from Boden Municipality
San Jose Sharks players
Stanley Cup champions
Swedish ice hockey defencemen
Sportspeople from Norrbotten County